The men's quadruple sculls event at the 2020 Summer Olympics took place from 23 to 28 July 2021 at the Sea Forest Waterway. 40 rowers from 10 nations competed.

Background

This was the 12th appearance of the event, which has been held every year since 1976.

The reigning medalists in the event were Germany, Australia, and Estonia. All three  qualified a boat for the event.

Qualification

Each National Olympic Committee (NOC) has been limited to a single boat in the event since 1912. There were 10 qualifying places in the men's quadruple sculls:

 8 from the 2019 World Championship
 2 from the final qualification regatta

Competition format

This rowing event is a quadruple scull event, meaning that each boat is propelled by four rowers. The "scull" portion means that the rower uses two oars, one on each side of the boat; this contrasts with sweep rowing in which each rower has one oar and rows on only one side. The competition consists of two rounds. Finals are held to determine the placing of each boat. The course used the 2000 metres distance that became the Olympic standard in 1912.

During the first round two heats were held. The first two boats in each heat advanced to final A, while all others were relegated to the repechages.

The repechage offered rowers a second chance to qualify for Final A. The top two boats in the repechage moved on to Final A, with the remaining boats sent to Final B.

There are two finals. Final A determined the medalists and the places through 6th. Final B determined places seven through ten.

Schedule

The competition was held over five days. 

All times are Japan Standard Time (UTC+9)

Results

Heats
The first two of each heat qualified for the final, while the remainder went to the repechage.

Heat 1

Heat 2

Repechage
The first two in the repechage qualified for the final, while the remainder went to the B final (out of medal contention).

Finals

Final B

Final A

References

Men's quadruple sculls
Men's events at the 2020 Summer Olympics